The Railyards Stadium is a planned 21,000 seat soccer-specific stadium to be built in Sacramento, California. It will serve as the home for Sacramento Republic FC, a USL club, with intentions to join Major League Soccer as an expansion team. The stadium is part of the Sacramento Railyards redevelopment project and it was unanimously approved in April 2019 by the Sacramento City Council, The stadium was scheduled to be completed by the start of the 2023 MLS season. However, the Sacramento expansion bid has been placed on indefinite hold as of February 2021. The status of the stadium remains undecided.

History
In late 2011, a group led by former California Assembly Speaker Fabian Núñez began exploring the possibility of having an MLS team in the Sacramento area, originally looking at stadium sites in the suburb of Elk Grove. Sacramento Republic FC was announced as a 2014 expansion team for the second-division United Soccer League on December 3, 2012. Local business leaders, including Warren Smith, hoped to convert the franchise to a Major League Soccer team by 2016. On September 17, 2014, the team announced its intentions to acquire property at the Sacramento Railyards infill project for a soccer stadium. More details of the stadium were announced in late 2015: HNTB was hired as the lead architects of the stadium, and the design of the stadium (partially influenced by fan input) was revealed on December 1, 2015. The official go-ahead from the City Council was given on November 10, 2016. However, the construction of the stadium was delayed as the team did not have an investor who satisfied the requirements of MLS. On January 22, 2019, Pittsburgh Penguins co-owner Ron Burkle was announced as the investor needed for MLS promotion. Around two months later, the stadium design was updated; additions to the old design included a 360-degree concourse/pedestrian walkway, new seating at the canopy level on the west side of the stadium, and additional field-level seating areas. The cost for the stadium was raised to approximately $252 million. Following the expansion announcement, construction on the stadium was expected to begin in 2020 ahead of a 2022 opening, but the COVID-19 pandemic delayed the move to MLS to 2023. The MLS expansion bid was placed on hold in March 2021 after Burkle left the ownership group.

In April 2022,the team announced plans for a downsized stadium on the site.The revised stadium plan,which is not contingent on the revival of the MLS bid,calls for a 12,000-15,000 seat facility that can be expanded in the future should demand warrant it.

Design
The current stadium design was unveiled in April 2019. Although the stadium is designed with a closed bowl, it will have separate stands on different sides, creating a distinct character for each one, reminiscent of St James' Park. In order to meet the designer's goal of creating MLS's best home-field advantage, the seating will feature the steepest grade in the league, as well as an untiered east side that bears similarities to  Westfalenstadion's Yellow Wall.

Major events

College soccer
On October 14, 2020, the NCAA announced that the stadium would host the semifinals and finals of the NCAA College Cup soccer tournament in 2024 and 2025; the men's tournament in 2024 and the Women's College Cup in 2025.

References

External links
 Project
 Sacramento MLS Stadium

 
Sports venues in Sacramento, California
Major League Soccer stadiums
Proposed stadiums in the United States
Soccer venues in California